Bo Van Pelt (born May 16, 1975) is an American professional golfer who has played on both the Nationwide Tour and the PGA Tour. He has featured in the top 20 of the Official World Golf Ranking.

Van Pelt was born in Richmond, Indiana. He graduated from Richmond High, where he was a two time All-State golfer and the 1993 Fred Keesling Award winner He attended Oklahoma State University where he became a member of the Sigma Chi fraternity.  His father, Bob, was selected in the fifth round of the 1967 NFL Draft by the Philadelphia Eagles after a collegiate football career as a center at Indiana University.

Van Pelt initially started his career on the Nationwide Tour and won the Omaha Classic, his first and only Nationwide Tour title, in 2003 after shooting a final round of 62. He now plays on the PGA Tour and captured his maiden victory in 2009 at the U.S. Bank Championship in Milwaukee, beating John Mallinger in a sudden death playoff on the second extra hole. He won the CIMB Asia Pacific Classic Malaysia in 2011, an Asian Tour event and an unofficial PGA Tour event. He carded a final round seven under 64 to romp to a six stroke victory and finish at 23 under par. On April 8, 2012, he scored a tournament low 64 in the 2012 Masters Tournament, propelling him up the leaderboard to a final tie for 17th place.

Van Pelt claimed his first victory on the European Tour in October 2012, when he won in Australia at the ISPS Handa Perth International. He won by two strokes over  fellow American Jason Dufner, having taken a one stroke advantage into the final round.

On June 13, 2021, Van Pelt finished T-2nd one stroke behind Garrick Higgo in the inaugural Palmetto Championship. The finish marked his biggest payday on Tour as well as the best finish in nearly nine years for Van Pelt, who spent the 2016-2019 PGA Tour seasons idle due to shoulder injuries.

Amateur wins
1991 Indiana (Boys) State Junior
1993 Indiana (Boys) State Junior
1995 Northern Amateur, Missouri Bluffs Intercollegiate
1997 John Burns Intercollegiate, NCAA Central Regional Championship

Professional wins (6)

PGA Tour wins (1)

PGA Tour playoff record (1–0)

European Tour wins (1)

1Co-sanctioned by the PGA Tour of Australasia

Asian Tour wins (1)

1Co-sanctioned by the PGA Tour, but unofficial money event.

Nationwide Tour wins (1)

Nationwide Tour playoff record (0–1)

Other wins (2)

Results in major championships

WD = withdrew
CUT = missed the half-way cut
"T" = tied

Summary

Most consecutive cuts made – 6 (2010 U.S. Open – 2011 Open Championship)
Longest streak of top-10s – 1

Results in The Players Championship

CUT = missed the halfway cut
"T" indicates a tie for a place

Results in World Golf Championships

QF, R16, R32, R64 = Round in which player lost in match play
"T" = Tied

U.S. national team appearances
Amateur
Palmer Cup: 1997 (winners)

See also
1998 PGA Tour Qualifying School graduates
2001 Buy.com Tour graduates
2003 Nationwide Tour graduates

References

External links

American male golfers
Oklahoma State Cowboys golfers
PGA Tour golfers
Korn Ferry Tour graduates
Golfers from Indiana
Golfers from Oklahoma
American people of Dutch descent
Sportspeople from Richmond, Indiana
Sportspeople from Tulsa, Oklahoma
1975 births
Living people